Jeremy James Kissner is an American actor.

Kissner's first film role was in 1998's remake of Great Expectations, playing the younger version of Ethan Hawke's character.

After an appearance on the television series Melrose Place, he starred in the lead role of the 1999 remake of A Dog of Flanders.

Kissner subsequently appeared on several television series, including ER and Touched by an Angel, as well as in several independent films.

From 2005 to 2007, he appeared in the Discovery Kids series Flight 29 Down as Eric.

Films

References

External links

1985 births
American male child actors
American male film actors
American male television actors
Living people